The International Race Grand Prix Doliny Baryczy Milicz is a one-day cycling race held annually in Poland. It was first held in 2016 and has been part of the UCI Europe Tour in category 1.2 since 2018.

Winners

References

Cycle races in Poland
2016 establishments in Poland
Recurring sporting events established in 2016
UCI Europe Tour races
Summer events in Poland